The Ghana Baptist University College is a Baptist Christian university college located at Kumasi in Ghana. The university has been granted accreditation by the National Accreditation Board. It is affiliated with the Ghana Baptist Convention.

History
The school was founded in 2006 by the Ghana Baptist Convention in Kumasi.  

In 2022, it received 100 acres of land in Ejura for the construction of a branch campus.

Campus
The university has two campuses.
City Campus - Amakom
Abuakwa campus - Abuakwa

Affiliations
Ghana Baptist University College is affiliated to the University of Cape Coast, the Ghana Baptist Convention and the Association of Ghana Private Universities.

Notes

External links
Gnana Tertiary Education Commission
Ghana Baptist Convention
University of Ghana

Christian universities and colleges in Ghana
Educational institutions established in 2006
2006 establishments in Ghana
Baptist universities and colleges
Baptist Christianity in Ghana